The "General Scholium" (Scholium Generale in the original Latin) is an essay written by Isaac Newton, appended to his work of Philosophiæ Naturalis Principia Mathematica, known as the Principia. It was first published with the second (1713) edition of the Principia and reappeared with some additions and modifications on the third (1726) edition. It is best known for the "Hypotheses non fingo" ("feign no hypothesis") expression, which Newton used as a response to some of the criticism received after the release of the first edition (1687). In the essay Newton not only counters the natural philosophy of René Descartes and Gottfried Leibniz, but also addresses issues of scientific methodology, theology, and metaphysics.

Rejecting Cartesian vortices
In the first paragraph of the General Scholium, Newton attacks René Descartes' model of the Solar System. Descartes and his supporters were followers of mechanical philosophy, a form of natural philosophy popular in the 17th century which maintained that nature and natural beings act similar to machines. In his book The World, Descartes suggests that the creation of the solar system and the circular motion of the planets around the Sun can be explained with the phenomena of "swirling vortices". Descartes also claimed that the world is made out of tiny "corpuscles" of matter, and that no vacuum could exist.

Descartes' model did not cohere with the ideas introduced in the first edition of the Principia (1687). Newton simply rejected Descartes' "corpuscles and vortices" theory and suggested that gravitational force acts upon celestial bodies regardless of the vast empty interstellar space in between. Newton was publicly criticised by Cartesians on this non-mechanistic theory. As a response to this criticism, Newton argued that Descartes' Vortices cannot explain the unique movement of comets. He sums up the paragraph with the words:

Scientific method argument 
Newton did not offer any reasons or causes for his law of gravity, and was therefore publicly criticised for introducing "occult agencies" into science. Newton objected to Descartes' and Leibniz's Scientific method of deriving conclusions by applying reason to a priori definitions rather than to empirical evidence, and famously stated "hypotheses non fingo", Latin for "I do not frame hypotheses":

The General Scholium then goes on to present Newton's own approach to scientific methodology. Contrary to the deductive approach of Descartes and Leibniz, Newton holds an inductive approach to scientific inquiry. Phenomena should first be observed, and then general rules should be searched for, and not vice versa. It is this approach, states Newton, that has led to the discovery of "the laws of motion and gravitation":

Theological views 
Most of the General Scholium deals with Newton's religious views. However, it is also considered the least understood part of the essay. Newton saw God as an intelligent, powerful, omnipresent Being which governs all. It has been claimed that the text implies that Newton was an anti-Trinitarianist heretic. With no comments explicitly addressing the subject of the Holy Trinity, several parts of the text seem to raise anti-Trinitarianist positions indirectly, most notably:

"The Spirit" 
The General Scholium ends with a mystifying paragraph about a "certain most subtle Spirit, which pervades and lies hid in all gross bodies." It has been largely interpreted as Newton's view and prospect of electricity, a phenomenon of which little was known at the time. Newton describes some attributes of this Spirit and concludes:

References

External links 
 The Newton Project Canada: The General Scholium online version and interpretation
 "Newton Reconsidered": Interview with prof. Stephen D. Snobelen about Newton and the General Scholium

Works by Isaac Newton